George Conn may refer to:

 George Conn (soccer), American soccer player
 George Conn (priest) (died 1640), Scottish Roman Catholic priest and papal diplomat